Ossa  is a village in the administrative district of Gmina Biała Rawska, within Rawa County, Łódź Voivodeship, in central Poland.

See also
 Ossa, Opoczno County

References

Ossa